Stephen Nicholas Tarpley (born February 17, 1993) is an American professional baseball pitcher for the Long Island Ducks of the Atlantic League of Professional Baseball. He made his MLB debut in 2018 for the New York Yankees and has also played for the Miami Marlins and New York Mets.

Career

Amateur career
Tarpley attended Gilbert High School in Gilbert, Arizona. The Cleveland Indians selected him in the eighth round of the 2011 Major League Baseball draft. He did not sign with the Indians and enrolled at the University of Southern California (USC) to play college baseball for the Trojans. After one year at USC, he transferred to Scottsdale Community College. In 2013, his sophomore and lone year at Scottsdale, he went 3–2 with a 2.35 ERA in 16 games (15 starts).

Baltimore Orioles
The Baltimore Orioles selected Tarpley in the third round of the 2013 Major League Baseball draft. He signed with the Orioles, receiving a $525,000 signing bonus, and spent 2013 with the Gulf Coast Orioles where he went 0–1 with a 2.14 ERA in seven starts. He spent 2014 with the Aberdeen IronBirds and compiled a 3–5 record and 3.66 ERA in 13 games (12 starts)

Pittsburgh Pirates
On January 27, 2015, the Orioles traded Tarpley along with a player to be named later to the Pittsburgh Pirates for Travis Snider. Pittsburgh assigned him to the West Virginia Power of the Class A South Atlantic League and he spent the whole season there, pitching to an 11–4 record, 2.48 ERA, and 1.15 WHIP in 20 starts. He began 2016 with the Bradenton Marauders of the Class A-Advanced Florida State League (FSL) and posted a 6–4 record and 4.32 ERA in 20 games started.

New York Yankees
On August 30, 2016, the Pirates traded Tarpley and Tito Polo to the New York Yankees as the players to be named later in the August 1 trade for Iván Nova. New York assigned him to the Tampa Yankees of the FSL, and he pitched in one game for them, giving up five runs in five innings. He spent 2017 with both Tampa and the Trenton Thunder of the Class AA Eastern League, going a combined 7–0 with an 0.88 ERA and 0.88 WHIP in 18 total relief appearances between the two clubs.

In 2018, Tarpley pitched for Trenton and Scranton/Wilkes-Barre RailRiders of the Class AAA International League. The Yankees promoted him to the major leagues on September 1, and he made his major league debut the next day. Tarpley pitched in 10 regular season games for the Yankees during his September call up and impressed the Yankees enough to be placed on their post-season roster. During the playoffs he pitched one inning in game three of the 2018 American League Division Series against the Red Sox.

On June 9, 2019, Tarpley recorded his first career save in an extra-innings win against the Cleveland Indians. Tarpley logged a 6.93 ERA in 21 appearances on the year.

On January 11, 2020, the Yankees designated Tarpley for assignment.

Miami Marlins
He was traded four days later to the Miami Marlins for James Nelson. On August 5, 2020, Tarpley earned his first Marlins save. In 12 games with Miami, Tarpley recorded a 2–2 record 9.00 ERA. On January 3, 2021, the Marlins designated Tarpley for assignment.

New York Mets
On January 8, 2021, Tarpley was claimed off waivers by the New York Mets. Tarpley struggled to a 15.58 ERA in 9 appearances for the Triple-A Syracuse Mets, and allowed 1 run in his only appearance with the Mets without recording an out. He was designated for assignment on July 11. Tarpley was released by the Mets on July 16.

Long Island Ducks
On April 22, 2022, Tarpley signed with the Long Island Ducks of the Atlantic League of Professional Baseball. He appeared in 20 games, making 16 starts and going 4-7 with a 4.64 ERA and 92 strikeouts in  innings pitched.

On July 9, 2022, Tarpley’s contract was purchased by the San Francisco Giants organization and he was assigned to the Double-A Richmond Flying Squirrels. However, Tarpley did not appear in a game for the Giants organization and re-signed with the Ducks on July 14.

References

External links

USC Trojans bio

1993 births
Living people
Aberdeen IronBirds players
African-American baseball players
Baseball players from Los Angeles
Bradenton Marauders players
Gulf Coast Orioles players
Major League Baseball pitchers
Long Island Ducks players
Miami Marlins players
New York Mets players
New York Yankees players
Scottsdale Fighting Artichokes baseball players
Scranton/Wilkes-Barre RailRiders players
Tampa Yankees players
Trenton Thunder players
USC Trojans baseball players
West Virginia Power players
Syracuse Mets players
21st-century African-American sportspeople